The Luscombe 8 is a series of high-wing, side-by-side-seating monoplanes with conventional landing gear, designed in 1937 and built by Luscombe Aircraft.

Development
Luscombe Aircraft closed in 1949, with its assets purchased by Temco Aircraft, also US-based. Temco built about 50 Silvaires before selling the rights to the Silvaire Aircraft Corporation in 1955.

Silvaire Aircraft Company: When TEMCO chose to discontinue production, the Luscombe tooling, parts and other assets were purchased by Otis Massey. Massey had been a Luscombe dealer since the 1930s. His new venture opened in Fort Collins, Colorado, as Silvaire Uranium and Aircraft Corp.  From 1956 to 1961, this firm produced 80 aircraft. The make and model for all 80 was Silvaire 8F, with "Luscombe" shown in quotation marks in company literature. N9900C, serial number S-1, was built in 1956. This first aircraft was constructed from spares or Material Review Board (MRB) parts that were serviceable, but remaining from TEMCO's prior production. TEMCO supplied enough inventory for the completion of approximately four aircraft. N9900C first flew on September 10, 1956 and was sold, according to the FAA aircraft database, to a dealer, Boggs Flying Brokers, in California the following spring. Six aircraft were built in 1957 (serial numbers S-2 through S7). Serial numbers S-2 and S-3 were shipped via C-46 aircraft to Buenos Aires, Argentina.

Luscombe Aircraft Corporation now manufactures new Luscombe aircraft based upon the 8 series.  They also restore vintage Luscombe aircraft to factory new.  Their website is https://www.luscombeair.com/.

Variants
Model 8
Initial variant with a  Continental A-50 engine.

Model 8A Luscombe Master
Model 8 with a higher power  Continental A-65 engine.
UC-90A
One Model 8A adopted by the United States Army Air Forces during World War II (s/n 42-79549).
Model 8B Luscombe Trainer
As Model 8A powered by a  Lycoming O-145 engine. One impressed by the United States Army Air Forces during World War II as UC-90 (s/n 42-79550).
Model 8C Silvaire Deluxe
As Model 8A powered by a  Continental A-75 engine.
Model 8D Silvaire Deluxe Trainer
As Model 8A with steerable tailwheel and other minor changes.
Model 8E Silvaire Deluxe
An improved Model 8C with increased gross weight and powered by an  Continental C-85 engine.
Model 8F
High-performance variant with a  Continental C-90 engine.
Model T8F Luscombe Observer
A tandem two-seat variant of the 8F for observation duties.
Model 8G
Was a proposed variant of the 8F with a tricycle landing gear, not built.
Luscombe LSA-8
Model for the US light-sport aircraft category, produced by the Luscombe Silvaire Company of Riverside, California and introduced at Sun 'n Fun 2007. The design is a Federal Aviation Administration accepted special light-sport aircraft.
Dair 100 testbed
One Luscombe 8A was equipped with a Dair 100 two-stroke diesel engine as a testbed aircraft.

Specifications (Silvaire 8-F)

Sub-Model T8F has tandem seating but is generally similar in dimension, Sprayer version approved for Restricted category operations can have higher Gross Weight with operational limits.

See also

References

External links

Luscombe Foundation

08
1930s United States civil utility aircraft
1930s United States sport aircraft
Single-engined tractor aircraft
High-wing aircraft
Aircraft first flown in 1937